Jan Holub (born May 3, 1983 in Liberec, Czechoslovakia) is a former Czech professional ice hockey defenceman who played in the Czech Extraliga.

Playing career
Holub has spent his whole career with HC Liberec, beginning at junior-level. He was picked for the 2001 NHL Entry Draft by the New York Islanders as a seventh-round pick, but has never played for the Islanders. He represented the Czech Republic junior team in 2003 World Junior Ice Hockey Championships, when Czech team was in quarterfinals.

Career statistics

Regular season and playoffs

International

External links
 
 Jan Holub on the official HC Liberec website

1983 births
HC Bílí Tygři Liberec players
Living people
Sportspeople from Liberec
New York Islanders draft picks
Czech ice hockey defencemen